The women's individual pursuit events at the 2011 UCI Para-cycling Track World Championships was held on March 11, 12 and 13.

Medalists
There were no medals awarded in the classification C1 event, as there was only one contestant.

Results

C1

C1 - locomotor disability: Neurological, or amputation

Finals

C2

C2 - locomotor disability: Neurological, decrease in muscle strength, or amputation

Qualifying

Finals

C4

C4 - locomotor disability: Neurological, or amputation

Qualifying

Finals

C5

C5 - locomotor disability: Neurological, or amputation

Qualifying

Finals

Tandem B

Tandem B - visual impairment

Qualifying

Finals

See also
2011 UCI Track Cycling World Championships – Women's individual pursuit

References

2011 UCI Para-cycling Track World Championships